The 1910 Chicago Cubs season was the 39th season of the Chicago Cubs franchise, the 35th in the National League and the 18th at West Side Park. The Cubs finished first in the National League with a record of 104–50, 13 games ahead of the second place New York Giants. The team was defeated four games to one by the Philadelphia Athletics in the 1910 World Series.

Regular season

Season standings

Record vs. opponents

Notable transactions 
 May 13, 1910: Doc Miller was traded by the Cubs to the Boston Doves for Lew Richie.

Roster

Player stats

Batting

Starters by position 
Note: Pos = Position; G = Games played; AB = At bats; H = Hits; Avg. = Batting average; HR = Home runs; RBI = Runs batted in

Other batters 
Note: G = Games played; AB = At bats; H = Hits; Avg. = Batting average; HR = Home runs; RBI = Runs batted in

Pitching

Starting pitchers 
Note: G = Games pitched; IP = Innings pitched; W = Wins; L = Losses; ERA = Earned run average; SO = Strikeouts

Other pitchers 
Note: G = Games pitched; IP = Innings pitched; W = Wins; L = Losses; ERA = Earned run average; SO = Strikeouts

Relief pitchers 
Note: G = Games pitched; W = Wins; L = Losses; SV = Saves; ERA = Earned run average; SO = Strikeouts

1910 World Series 

AL Philadelphia Athletics (4) vs. NL Chicago Cubs (1)

References

External links
1910 Chicago Cubs season at Baseball Reference

Chicago Cubs seasons
Chicago Cubs season
National League champion seasons
Chicago Cubs